was a Japanese politician of the Democratic Party of Japan, a member of the House of Councillors in the Diet (national legislature).

A native of Shiogama, Miyagi and graduate of Meiji Gakuin University, he was elected to the House of Councillors for the first time in 2007 after serving in the House of Representatives for two terms.

References

External links 
 Official website in Japanese.

1947 births
2013 deaths
Politicians from Miyagi Prefecture
Japanese announcers
Members of the House of Representatives (Japan)
Members of the House of Councillors (Japan)
Democratic Party of Japan politicians
Meiji Gakuin University alumni
People from Shiogama, Miyagi
21st-century Japanese politicians